Mhairi-Bronté Duncan (born 25 November 1997) is a New Zealand female curler.

Teams and events

Women's

Mixed

Mixed doubles

References

External links

 
 
 
 

 
 

Living people
1997 births
Sportspeople from Dunedin
New Zealand female curlers